Marghera is a municipalità (borough) of the comune of Venice, Italy. It includes the industrial area known as Porto Marghera (English: Marghera Port) or Venezia Porto Marghera.

Etymology
The name Marghera is said in popular myth to come from Venetian dialectal "Mar gh' era," meaning "There was the sea"; the original form, however, was Mergaria, whose origin is unclear.

History
At the beginning of the 20th century Venice's existing port at Bacino San Marco was incapable of servicing large modern ships. A new port was constructed at the western end of Venice at Stazione Marittima, but it became clear that if industry was developed in its immediate vicinity it would negatively impact on the historical city and tourism. As a result, by 1917 – during the First World War – the Italian government decided to develop an industrial zone and state-of-the-art port at Marghera on the mainland, opposite Venice and near the town of Mestre. A major backer of the scheme was Count Giuseppe Volpi. 

Development commenced in 1920, and for 10 years shipping channels were dredged, excavations and land reclamation took place. A residential area was constructed for the zone's workers. In 1923, the first chemical factory commenced production. The number of workers employed in the zone rose to 6000 by 1930, 16,000 by 1950 and 35,000 by 1970.

In 1926 Marghera and Mestre were made a frazione under the control of the municipal government of Venice. 
By 1940, more than 60 factories were established at Marghera, and as a result during World War II Allied bombers targeted Porto Marghera.

On May 15, 2020, a fire in a chemical plant producing cosmetics, including nail varnish remover, forced Venetians to stay indoors.

Population
The Municipalità di Marghera, one of the six boroughs of Venice's comune, includes 30,000 inhabitants, with Marghera alone including 17,000 inhabitants.

Economy
The Enichem fertilizer company operates in Marghera.

Eagles Airlines had its head office in Marghera.

3V Sigma, part of the multinational Sigma corporation, has a chemical plant producing cosmetics in Porto Maghera; it had a chemical fire in May 2020.

References

Bibliography

External links

Official website 

Frazioni of the Metropolitan City of Venice
Geography of Venice
Populated places established in 1917
1917 establishments in Italy
20th-century establishments in Venice